Digital asset management (DAM) and the implementation of its use as a computer application is required in the collection of digital assets to ensure that the owner, and possibly their delegates, can perform operations on the data files.

Terminology 

The term media asset management (MAM) may be used in reference to Digital Asset Management when applied to the sub-set of digital objects commonly considered "media", namely audio recordings, photos, and videos. Any editing process that involves media, especially video, can make use of a MAM to access media components to be edited together, or to be combined with a live feed, in a fluent manner. A MAM typically offers at least one searchable index of the images, audio, and videos it contains constructed from metadata harvested from the images using pattern recognition, or input manually.

Management

Creation

Applications implement digital asset management by importing it from the analog and/or digital domains (by encoding, scanning, optical character recognition, etc.) or by authoring it as new object.

Indexing
A primary function of a DAM system is to make assets easily available to its users by providing a searchable index that supports retrieval of assets by their content and/or metadata. The cataloging function is usually part of the ingestion process for new assets.

Workflow
Digital assets will typically have a lifecycle, which may include various states such as creation, approval, live, archived and deleted.

Version control
Often a DAM system will store earlier versions of a digital asset and allow those to be downloaded or reverted to. Therefore, a DAM system can operate as an advanced type of version control system.

Access control
Finally, a DAM system typically includes security controls ensuring relevant people have access to assets. This will often involve integration with existing directory services via a technology such as single sign-on.

Categorization 

Smaller DAM systems are used in a particular operational context, for instance in video production systems. The key differentiators between them are the types of input encoders used for creating digital copies of assets to bring them under management, and the output decoders and/or formatters used to make them usable as documents and/or online resources. The metadata of a content item can serve as a guide to the selection of the codec(s) needed to handle the content during processing, and may be of use when applying access control rules to enforce authorization policy.

Requirements 
Assets that require particular technology to be used in a workflow need to have their requirements for bandwidth, latency, and access control considered in the design of the tools that create or store them, and in the architecture of the system that distributes and archives them.
When not being worked on assets can be held in a DAM in a variety of formats including blob (binary large object in a database) or as a file in a normal file system, that are "cheaper" to store than the form needed during operations on them. This makes it possible to implement a large scale DAM as an assembly of high performance processing systems in a network with a high density storage solution at its center.

Types of systems

Digital asset management systems fall into the following classifications:
 Brand management system to enforce brand presentation within an organization by making the approved logos, fonts, and product images easily available.
 Library or archive for bulk storage of infrequently changing video or photo assets.
 Media asset management systems for handling assets in the audiovisual domain including audio, video, or still images.
 Production management systems for handling assets being created on the fly for use in live media production or as visual effects for use in gaming applications, TV, or films.
 Streaming for on-demand delivery of digital content, like TV shows or movies, to end users on behalf of digital retailers.

All of these types will include features for work-flow management, collaboration, project-management, and revision control.

Media asset issues 

An asset can exist in several formats and in a sequence of versions. The digital version of the original asset is generally captured in as high a resolution, colour depth, and (if applicable) frame rate as will be needed to ensure that results are of acceptable quality for the end-use. There can also be thumbnail copies of lower quality for use in visual indexing.

Metadata for an asset can include its packaging, encoding, provenance, ownership and access rights, and location of original creation. It is used to provide hints to the tools and systems used to work on, or with, the asset about how it should be handled and displayed.

See also
 Content management
 Digital asset
 Digital library
 Digital preservation
 Digital rights management
 Image organizer, possible presentation layer for a DAM
 Web content management system, may be a presentation layer for a DAM
Enterprise content management

References

Further reading
 
 
 
 
 
 

Content management systems
Document management systems
Records management
Asset management